"I Need Your Loving" is a song by English synth-pop band the Human League, released as the second single from their fifth studio album, Crash (1986). The song was written by Jimmy Jam, Terry Lewis, David Eiland, Langston Richey, Danny Williams and Herman Davis ( Randy Ran).

Background 
As were many other tracks from the album, "I Need Your Loving" was aimed towards the US market, where the first single from Crash, "Human", had reached number one. The single was recorded at the Flyte Time studios Minneapolis under the production of Jimmy Jam and Terry Lewis while the Human League had been in residence from February until April 1986.
In the UK it was promoted with a cheaply and badly filmed music video and it became the band's worst showing in the UK charts ever, only reaching number 72. The song was savaged by critics at the time and has now been largely disowned by the band since.

Music video
The video for "I Need Your Loving" was recorded on a very limited budget compared to previous Human League videos. It was directed by Andy Morahan, who had done the previous video for "Human". In many ways the video is a rehash of the video for The Lebanon, being filmed at a fake concert/studio appearance to an audience of extras. The camera swings wildly around the band as they play the song, and continually focuses in and out in time with the music, which caused some viewers to complain it made them feel motion sick.

Track listing
 7" vinyl (Virgin VS900)
 "I Need Your Loving" – 3:43
 "I Need Your Loving (Instrumental Version)" – 3:40

 12" vinyl (Virgin VS900-12)
 "I Need Your Loving (Extended Version)" – 7:12
 "I Need Your Loving (Acapella Version)" – 3:40
 "I Need Your Loving (Dub Version)" – 6:40
 "I Need Your Loving (Instrumental Version)" – 3:40

Charts

References

External links
THE HUMAN LEAGUE

1986 songs
1986 singles
The Human League songs
Music videos directed by Andy Morahan
Songs written by Jimmy Jam and Terry Lewis
Song recordings produced by Jimmy Jam and Terry Lewis
Virgin Records singles